The Snow Mountain quail (Synoicus monorthonyx), is a large, approximately 28 cm (11 in) long, dark brown quail of alpine grasslands. It was formerly considered the only member of the genus Anurophasis, but phylogenetic analysis places it as the sister species to the brown quail (S. ypsilophorus) in the genus Synoicus. It has heavily marked brown plumage, a pale yellow bill, yellow legs and a brown iris. The underparts of the female are whitish and more distinctly barred black than in the male.

The Snow Mountain quail is confined to Western New Guinea's highest elevations, the Snow and Star Mountains.

The female usually lays up to three pale brown, dark-spotted eggs in a hollow nest under the edge of a grass tussock. The diet consists mainly of seeds, flowers, leaves, and other vegetable matter.

Due to its limited range, parts of which are getting increasingly accessible, the Snow Mountain quail is evaluated as "near threatened" on the IUCN Red List of Threatened Species.

References

External links
 BirdLife Species Factsheet
 Red Data Book

Quails
Synoicus
Birds of Western New Guinea
Endemic fauna of New Guinea
Endemic fauna of Indonesia
Birds described in 1910
Taxa named by Eduard Daniël van Oort
Taxobox binomials not recognized by IUCN